Elections to Liverpool City Council were held on 1 November 1906.

One councillor was elected for each of the thirty-four wards.
A total of fourteen councillors were elected unopposed, and twenty councillors were elected in contested elections.

Fourteen of the thirty-four seats were uncontested.

The Liverpool Protestant Party lost all three of the seats that they had won in the 1903 elections.

After the election, the composition of the council was:

Election result

Ward results

* - Retiring Councillor seeking re-election

Comparisons are made with the 1903 election results, as the retiring councillors were elected in that year.

Abercromby

Aigburth

Anfield

Breckfield

Brunswick

Castle Street

Dingle

Edge Hill

Everton

Exchange

Fairfield

Garston

Granby

Great George

Kensington

Kirkdale

Low Hill

Netherfield

North Scotland

Old Swan

Prince's Park

Sandhills

St. Anne's

St. Domingo

St. Peter's

Sefton Park East

Sefton Park West

South Scotland

Vauxhall

Walton

Warbreck

Wavertree

Wavertree West

West Derby

Aldermanic elections

Aldermanic Election 5 December 1906

Caused by the death of Alderman Thomas Evans (Conservative, elected 9 November 1901).

In his place, Councillor Louis Samuel Cohen (Conservative, Breckfield, elected 1 November 1905) was elected by the Council as an alderman on 5 December 1906

Aldermanic election

The death of Alderman Joseph Ball JP (Conservative, elected as an alderman on 9 November 1901) on 11 August 1907 was reported to the council on 4 September 1907.

This positionwas filled by ???

By-elections

No. 6 Breckfield, 23 January 1907

Caused by Councillor Louis Samuel Cohen (Conservative, Breckfield, elected on 1 November 1905) being elected by the Council as an alderman on
5 December 1906.

See also

 Liverpool City Council
 Liverpool Town Council elections 1835 - 1879
 Liverpool City Council elections 1880–present
 Mayors and Lord Mayors of Liverpool 1207 to present
 History of local government in England

References

1906
1906 English local elections
1900s in Liverpool